John Spoltore could refer to: 

John J. Spoltore (1921–1973), American politician
John Spoltore (ice hockey) (1971–2010), American professional ice hockey player